Rasmus is the surname of:

 Claire Rasmus (born 1996), American freestyle swimmer
 Colby Rasmus (born 1986), American Major League Baseball player
 Cory Rasmus (born 1987), American Major League Baseball player
 Ingolf E. Rasmus (1906–1996), American lawyer and politician
 Pete Rasmus (1906–1975), American discus thrower